WVRC may refer to:

 WVRC (AM), a radio station (1400 AM) licensed to Spencer, West Virginia, United States
 WVRC-FM, a radio station (104.7 FM) licensed to Spencer, West Virginia, United States
 Wabash Valley Railroad (reporting mark WVRC)
 West Virginia Radio Corporation